Apparatus may refer to:
Technical term for a body of the Soviet and post-Soviet governments (see Apparatchik)
Machine
Equipment
Critical apparatus, the critical and primary source material that accompanies an edition of a text
"Apparatus" (song), a song by Bombus
Apparatus (band), an electro-industrial group active during the nineties
 Apparatus (album), 1995 release by the band Apparatus
Apparatus (journal), an academic journal on film 
 In gymnastics, any of the individual events, or the equipment used in performing the event
 A piece of laboratory equipment
 in anatomy, a group of organs, see Apparatus (anatomy)

See also
Firefighting apparatus
Golgi apparatus, an organelle found in most eukaryotic cells
Apparatus theory, within cinema studies during the 1970s
The Red Jumpsuit Apparatus, a post-hardcore band 
Ideological state apparatuses, a philosophical construct by Louis Althusser